Eileen Bennett Whittingstall (née Bennett; 16 July 1907 – c. 18 August 1979, full name Eileen Viviyen Bennett Fearnley-Whittingstall) was a tennis player from the United Kingdom who won six Grand Slam doubles titles from 1927 to 1931.

Career
Although most of her success was in women's doubles or mixed doubles, Whittingstall reached the singles final of the 1928 French Championships and the 1931 US Championships. She lost both of these finals in straight sets to Helen Wills Moody. She twice won the women's doubles title at the French Championships: in 1928 with Phoebe Holcroft Watson and in 1931 with Betty Nuthall. Whittingstall and Nuthall lost the 1932 final to the team of Moody and Elizabeth Ryan.

Whittingstall teamed with Ermyntrude Harvey to reach the 1928 women's doubles final at Wimbledon, losing to the team of Watson and Peggy Saunders 2–6, 3–6. She also teamed with Shoemaker to win the 1931 women's doubles title at the U.S. Championships, defeating Helen Jacobs and Dorothy Round Little in the final in two sets. Whittingstall twice partnered with Henri Cochet to win the mixed doubles title at the French Championships. In both 1928 and 1929, they defeated the team of Moody and Frank Hunter in the final. Whittingstall and Cochet lost the 1930 French final to the team of Bill Tilden and Cilly Aussem.

Whittingstall and Cochet won the mixed doubles title at the 1927 US Championships, defeating Hazel Wightman and René Lacoste in the final.

According to A. Wallis Myers of The Daily Telegraph and the Daily Mail, Whittingstall was ranked in the world top 10 in 1928, 1929, 1931, and 1932, reaching a career high of World No. 3 in those rankings in 1931.

Bennett is credited with first wearing an above-the-knee form of divided skirt for competitive tennis.

Personal life
She was married on 19 November 1929 to Edmund Fearnley-Whittingstall, a painter, and divorced in 1936. She married Marcus Marsh, a racehorse trainer, on 28 September 1936 and gave birth to a daughter on 7 March 1937. She was divorced from Mr Marsh in early 1947 and married Mr Geoffrey Ackroyd in June 1947. She married for a fourth and final time in June 1957 to Mr Carl Vyvyan Forslind who outlived her.

Grand Slam finals

Singles (2 runners-up)

Doubles (3 titles, 2 runners-up)

Mixed doubles (3 titles, 1 runner-up)

Grand Slam singles tournament timeline

See also
 Performance timelines for all female tennis players who reached at least one Grand Slam final

References

External links
 Set of eight portraits by Bassano's studio

British female tennis players
French Championships (tennis) champions
United States National champions (tennis)
1907 births
1979 deaths
Grand Slam (tennis) champions in women's doubles
Grand Slam (tennis) champions in mixed doubles
English female tennis players
Tennis people from Greater London